Bârsești is a commune in Vrancea County.

Bârseşti may also refer to several places in Romania:

 Bârsești, a village administered by Târgu Jiu municipality, Gorj County
 Bârsești, a village in Budești Commune, Vâlcea County
 Bârsești, a village in Mihăești Commune, Vâlcea County
 Bârseștii de Jos and Bârseștii de Sus, villages in Tigveni Commune, Argeș County
 Bârseștii de Sus, a village in Sprâncenata Commune, Olt County
 Bârseștii de Jos, a village in Beciu Commune, Teleorman County

See also 
 Bârsău (disambiguation)